Robert M. Duncan may refer to:

 Robert Morton Duncan (1927–2012), United States federal judge
 Mike Duncan (Robert M. Duncan, born 1951), chairman of the Republican National Committee
 Robert M. Duncan (Oregon politician), former president of the Oregon State Senate
 Robert M. Duncan Jr. (born 1978), United States Attorney for the Eastern District of Kentucky

See also
Robert Duncan (disambiguation)